Bill Bradley (born 1943) was a U.S. Senator from New Jersey. Senator Bradley may also refer to:

Members of the United States Senate
Stephen R. Bradley (1754–1830), U.S. Senator from Vermont in the early 1800s
William O'Connell Bradley (1847–1914), U.S. Senator from Kentucky

United States state senate members
Daniel Bradley (politician) (1833–1908), New York State Senate
David Bradley (politician) (born 1952), Arizona State Senate
Dennis Bradley (born 1983), Connecticut State Senate
Edward Bradley (politician) (1808–1847), Michigan State Senate
George B. Bradley (1825–1916), New York State Senate
Henry Roswell Bradley (1832–1870), Connecticut State Senate
James A. Bradley (1830–1921), New Jersey State Senate
Jeb Bradley (born 1952), New Hampshire State Senate
John J. Bradley (1831–1891), New York State Senate
Nathan B. Bradley (1831–1906), Michigan State Senate
Rob Bradley (born 1970), Florida State Senate
Walter Dwight Bradley (born 1946), New Mexico State Senate
William J. Bradley (1852–1916), New Jersey State Senate